Stopnica Monastery is a stone reformist monastery in Stopnica, Poland that was founded by Krzysztof Ossoliński 1587–1645 in the seventeenth century.

Christian monasteries in Poland
Christian monasteries established in the 17th century
Busko County
Buildings and structures in Świętokrzyskie Voivodeship